Pleuroploca is a genus of very large predatory sea snails with an operculum, marine gastropod mollusks in the family Fasciolariidae, which includes the spindle shells, the tulip shells and other allied genera.

Species
According to the World Register of Marine Species (WoRMS), the following species with valid names are included within the genus Pleuroplaca :
 Pleuroploca abbasi Thach, 2021
 Pleuroploca audouini (Jonas, 1846)
 Pleuroploca clava (Jonas, 1846)
 Pleuroploca effendyi Dharma, 2021
 Pleuroploca granosa (Broderip, 1832)
 Pleuroploca lischkeana (Dunker, 1863)
 Pleuroploca lyonsi Bozzetti, 2008
 Pleuroploca ponderosa (Jonas, 1850)
 Pleuroploca purpurea (Jonas, 1849)
 Pleuroploca trapezium (Linnaeus, 1758)

 Species brought into synonymy
 Pleuroploca acutispsira (Strebel, 1911): synonym of Triplofusus princeps (G.B. Sowerby I, 1825)
 Pleuroploca altimasta Iredale, 1930: synonym of Filifusus altimasta (Iredale, 1930)
 Pleuroploca aurantiaca (Lamarck, 1816): synonym of Aurantilaria aurantiaca (Lamarck, 1816)
 Pleuroploca australasia (Perry, 1811): synonym of Australaria australasia (Perry, 1811)
 Pleuroploca buxeus (Reeve, 1847):: synonym of Viridifusus buxeus (Reeve, 1847)
 Pleuroploca eucla Cotton, 1953: synonym of Australaria eucla (Cotton, 1953)
 Pleuroploca filamentosa (Röding, 1798):: synonym of Filifusus filamentosus (Röding, 1798)
 Pleuroploca gigantea now recognized as Triplofusus papillosus (G. B. Sowerby I, 1825)
 Pleuroploca glabra (Dunker, 1882): synonym of Filifusus glaber (Dunker, 1882)
 Pleuroploca granulilabris Vermeij & Snyder, 2004:: synonym of Leucozonia granulilabris (Vermeij & Snyder, 2004)
 Pleuroploca heynemanni (Dunker, 1870): synonym of Kilburnia heynemanni (Dunker, 1870)
 Pleuroploca lugubris (A. Adams & Reeve in Reeve, 1847):: synonym of Lugubrilaria lugubris (A. Adams & Reeve, 1847)
 Pleuroploca manuelae Bozzetti, 2008: synonym of Filifusus manuelae (Bozzetti, 2008)
 Pleuroploca princeps (G.B. Sowerby I, 1825):: synonym of Triplofusus princeps (G.B. Sowerby I, 1825)
 Pleuroploca salmo (Wood, 1828):: synonym of Granolaria salmo (Wood, 1828)
 Pleuroploca scholvieni (Strebel, 1911):: synonym of Kilburnia scholvieni (Strebel, 1911)
 Pleuroploca wattersae (Kilburn, 1974):: synonym of Africolaria wattersae (Kilburn, 1974)

References

 Snyder, M.A. (2003) Catalogue of the marine gastropod family Fasciolariidae. Academy of Natural Sciences of Philadelphia, Special Publication, 21, iii + 1–431
 Snyder M.A., Vermeij G.J. & Lyons W.G. (2012) The genera and biogeography of Fasciolariinae (Gastropoda, Neogastropoda, Fasciolariidae). Basteria 76(1-3): 31-70.

Fasciolariidae